Hanon Reznikov (born Howard Reznick; September 23, 1950 – May 3, 2008) was an American actor and writer.

He was also the co-director of The Living Theatre in New York City together with his wife Judith Malina following Julian Beck's death in 1985.

References

External links

Obituary
Hanon Reznikov article
Hanon Reznikov interview

American theatre directors
1950 births
American male stage actors
20th-century American dramatists and playwrights
Yale University alumni
2008 deaths
Writers from Brooklyn
Place of birth missing